Caroline Yates-Bell (born 1936) is a British former tennis player.

Yates-Bell is the only daughter of London surgeon Geoffrey Yates-Bell and Winifred Perryman.

Active in the 1950s and 1960s, Yates-Bell's career included a 6–2, 6–0 win over Billie Jean Moffitt at the 1962 Queen's Club Championships. She was a mixed doubles quarter-finalist at the 1963 U.S. National Championships.

In 1964 she married Northern Irish doctor Ian Hamilton.

References

1936 births
Living people
British female tennis players
English female tennis players
Tennis people from Greater London